Justin Smith (born 1978) is a British milliner based in London, who creates bespoke millinery under the J Smith Esquire brand for private clients and film.  Smith's hats have been exhibited around the world, and have been acquired by such museums as the Fashion Institute of Technology in New York and the Victoria & Albert Museum in London. He has been a visiting lecturer at London's Royal College of Art and has conducted seminars and teaching workshops for the British Council.

Early life 
From 1998 to 2002, Smith was Creative Director and Head of Avant Garde for the Toni & Guy Group. In 2003, he established his own J Smith Esquire hairdressing salon in London's Soho, specializing in conceptual and avant-garde styles, session styling for the style press, advertising campaigns and a portfolio of private clients that he retains to the present day.  During his early career, Smith was a British Hairdressing Awards finalist as Avant-Garde Hairdresser of the Year in 2001 and winner of the first prize at the 2000 London Alternative Hair Show. Smith is a graduate of the London College of Fashion, Kensington and Chelsea College, and Royal College of Art with an MA in Millinery. in 2007.

Millinery career 
Smith established the J Smith Esquire brand in 2007, following his Royal College of Art graduation collection called Le Cirque Macabre. The brand has produced sixteen collections since its launch.

Since 2007, J Smith Esquire has been shown at London, Paris and Milan fashion weeks, alongside new and emerging fashion events such as Rome Couture and Jakarta Fashion Week. He continues to collaborate with designers including Stella McCartney, Moschino, Manish Arora, Oscar Lawalata, Aganovich, Emilio de la Morena and Aveda.

In 2011, a retrospective exhibition, installation and book launch took place at the Royal Horseguards Hotel, London, celebrating bespoke doorman hats made by for the hotel group. In 2012, as part of London's Jubilee celebrations, Smith was invited to take part in BT Artbox, transforming a replica phone kiosk, and Hatwalk, commissioned by the Mayor of London, in partnership with BT and Grazia magazine, putting a hat on the statue of Queen Victoria on London's Blackfriars Bridge.

Awards 
Smith was awarded the 2016 Generali Future Award, supporting creativity and innovation, by International Talent Support at a live presentation in Trieste, Italy in July 2016. This is the second time Smith has been awarded by International Talent Support, having previously won the Maria Louisa and I-D Styling awards at ITS6 in 2007. His previous awards include Young Fashion Entrepreneur of the Year Award for 2011 awarded by the British Council and New Generation sponsorship and inclusion over several years in the Hedonism millinery collective, awarded by the British Fashion Council.

Films 
In 2012, Smith created the leather head wraps for Angelina Jolie in Maleficent on which he worked in collaboration with the actor. Since Maleficent he has also produced hats for Jolie and Brad Pitt in By The Sea; for Amanda Seyfried, Kathy Burke and ensemble nuns in Pan; and for Armie Hammer and Alicia Vikander in The Man from U.N.C.L.E..

Music 
Smith's hats have featured in the live performances of musicians Neil Tennant, Kelis and Matthew Herbert.

References

External links

English fashion designers
British milliners
1978 births
Living people